Vietnam competed at the 2019 Military World Games held in Wuhan, China from 18 to 27 October 2019. In total, 32 athletes represented Vietnam, aiming to and succeeding in winning one silver and one bronze medal. The country finished in 46th place in the medal table.

Medal summary

Medal by sports

Medalists

References

External links 
 2019 Military World Games Swimming Results
 2019 Military World Games Results

Nations at the 2019 Military World Games
2019 in Vietnamese sport